Bukharan Jews (Bukharian: יהודיאני בוכארא/яҳудиёни Бухоро, Yahudiyoni Bukhoro; , Yehudey Bukhara), in modern times also called Bukharian Jews (Bukharian: יהודיאני בוכארי/яҳудиёни бухорӣ, Yahudiyoni Bukhorī; , Yehudim Bukharim), are an ethnoreligious Jewish sub-group of Central Asia that historically spoke Bukharian, a Judeo-Tajik dialect of the Tajik language, in turn a variety of the Persian language. Their name comes from the former Central Asian Emirate of Bukhara (now primarily Uzbekistan), which once had a sizable Jewish population. Bukharan Jews comprise Persian-speaking Jewry along with the Jews of Iran, Afghanistan, and the Caucasus Mountains. 

Since the dissolution of the Soviet Union, the great majority have immigrated to Israel or to the United States while others have immigrated to Europe or Australia. Bukharan Jews are Mizrahi Jews.

Name and language

The Bukharan Jews originally called themselves Bnei Israel (children of the northern Kingdom of Israel), which relates specifically to the Israelites of Assyrian captivity. The term Bukharan was coined by European travellers who visited Central Asia around the 16th century. Since most of the Jewish community at the time lived under the Emirate of Bukhara, they came to be known as Bukharan Jews. The name by which the community called itself is "Bnei Isro'il" (Israelites of the Northern Kingdom of Israel). Their Muslim neighbors would call them Yahudi, which is misidentification, since it is specific to the southern Kingdom of Judah, but the Bnei Israel self-designation emphasizes their Israelite origins from the northern Kingdom of Israel.

Bukharan Jews used Bukharian or Bukhori, a Jewish dialect of the Tajik language (in turn a variety of Persian) with linguistic elements of Hebrew, to communicate among themselves. This language was used for all cultural and educational life among the Jews. It was used widely until Central Asia was "Russified" by the Russians and the dissemination of "religious" information was halted. The elderly Bukharian generation used Bukhori as their primary language but largely speak Russian (sometimes with a slight Bukharian accent). The younger generation use Russian as their primary language, but often do understand or speak Bukharian.

The first primary written account of Jews in Central Asia dates to the beginning of the 4th century CE. It is recalled in the Talmud by Rabbi Shmuel bar Bisna, a member of the Talmudic academy in Pumbeditha, who traveled to Margiana (present-day Merv in Turkmenistan). The presence of Jewish communities in Merv is also proven by Jewish writings on ossuaries from the 5th and 6th centuries, uncovered between 1954 and 1956.

History

While some Bukharan Jews relate their own ancestry to the period of the Assyrian captivity and exiles from the tribes of Naphtali and Issachar, basing this assumption on a reading of "Habor" at II Kings 17:6 as a reference to Bukhara, Bukharan Jewish tradition generally associates their establishment in the country with the emigration of Persian Jews, fleeing the persecutions of King Peroz I (458–485 CE). In the opinion of some scholars, Jews settled in Central Asia in the sixth century, but it is certain that during the eighth to ninth centuries they lived in Central Asian cities such as Balkh, Khwarezm, and Merv. At that time, and until approximately the sixteenth century, Bukharan Jews formed a group continuous with Jews of Iran and Afghanistan.

The Bukharan Jews are considered one of the oldest ethno-religious groups of Central Asia and over the years they have developed their own distinct culture. Throughout the years, Jews from other Eastern countries such as Iraq, Iran, Yemen, Syria, and Morocco migrated into Central Asia (by way of the Silk Road).

16th to 18th centuries

During the 18th century, Bukharan Jews faced considerable discrimination and persecution. Jewish centers were closed down, the Muslims of the region usually forced conversion on the Jews, and the Bukharan Jewish population dramatically decreased to the point where they were almost extinct. Due to pressures to convert to Islam, persecution, and isolation from the rest of the Jewish world, the Jews of Bukhara began to lack knowledge and practice of their Jewish religion. By the middle of the 18th century, practically all Bukharan Jews lived in the Bukharan Emirate.

Rabbi Yosef Maimon

In 1793, a missionary kabbalist named Rabbi Yosef Maimon, who was a Sephardic Jew originally from Tetuan, Morocco, travelled to Bukhara to collect/solicit money from Jewish patrons.  Prior to Maimon's arrival, the native Jews of Bukhara followed the Persian religious tradition. Maimon staunchly demanded that the native Jews of Bukhara adopt Sephardic traditions. Many of the native Jews were opposed to this and the community split into two factions. The followers of the Maimon clan eventually won the struggle for religious authority over the native Bukharans, and Bukharan Jewry forcefully switched to Sephardi customs. The supporters of the Maimon clan, in the conflict, credit Maimon with causing a revival of Jewish practice among Bukharan Jews which they claim was in danger of dying out. However, there is evidence that there were Torah scholars present upon his arrival to Bukhara, but because they followed the Persian rite their practices were aggressively rejected as incorrect by Maimon.  Maimon is an ancestor of Shlomo Moussaieff, author Jeffrey Moussaieff Masson, and the former First Lady of Iceland Dorrit Moussaieff.

19th century
In 1843 the Bukharan Jews were visited by the so-called "Eccentric Missionary", Joseph Wolff, a Jewish convert to Christianity who had set himself the broad task of finding the Lost Tribes of Israel and the narrow one of seeking two British officers who had been captured by the Emir, Nasrullah Khan. Wolff wrote prolifically of his travels, and the journals of his expeditions provide valuable information about the life and customs of the peoples he travelled amongst, including the Bukharan Jews. In 1843, for example, they collected 10,000 silver tan'ga and purchased land in Samarkand, known as Makhallai Yakhudion, close to Registon.

In the middle of the 19th century, Bukharan Jews began to move to Palestine. The land on which they settled in Jerusalem was named the Bukharan quarter (Sh'hunat HaBucharim) and still exists today.

In 1865, Russian troops took over Tashkent, and there was a large influx of Jews to the newly created Turkestan Region. From 1876 to 1916, Jews were free to practice Judaism. Dozens of Bukharan Jews held prestigious jobs in medicine, law, and government, and many Jews prospered. Many Bukharan Jews became successful and well-respected actors, artists, dancers, musicians, singers, film producers, and sportsmen. Several Bukharan entertainers became artists of merit and gained the title "People's Artist of Uzbekistan", "People's Artist of Tajikistan", and even (in the Soviet era) "People's Artist of the Soviet Union". Jews succeeded in the world of sport also, with several Bukharan Jews in Uzbekistan becoming renowned boxers and winning many medals for the country. Still, Bukharan Jews were forbidden to ride in the streets and had to wear distinctive costumes. They were relegated to a ghetto, and often fell victim to persecution from the Muslim majority.

Soviet era

By the time of the Russian revolution, the Bukharan Jews were one of the most isolated Jewish communities in the world.

Following the Soviet capture of Bukhara, synagogues were destroyed or closed down, and were replaced by Soviet institutions. Consequently many Bukharan Jews fled to the West. The route they undertook went through Afghanistan, as the neighbouring country had many possibilities to the west. Consequently, Central Asian Jews in Paris had an Afghan nationality while a minority of them were born in Afghanistan. For instance many Jewish families with the Afghan nationality were born in Kokand. Soviet doctrines, ideology and nationalities policy had a large impact on the everyday life, culture and identity of the Bukharan Jews. The remaining community attempted to preserve their traditions while displaying loyalty to the new government.

Stalin's decision to end Lenin's New Economic Policy and initiate the First five-year plan in the late 1920s resulted in a drastic deterioriation of living conditions for the Bukharan Jews. By the time Soviet authorities established their hold over the borders in Central Asia in the mid 1930s, many tens of thousands of households from Central Asia had crossed the border into Iran and Afghanistan, amongst them some 4,000 Bukharan Jews (comprising about one tenth of the total number of Bukharan Jews in Central Asia), who were heading towards Palestine.

Bukharan Jews who had put efforts into creating a Bukharan Jewish Soviet culture and national identity were charged during Stalin's Great Purge, or, as part of the Soviet Union's nationalities policies and nation building campaigns, were forced to assimilate into the larger Soviet Uzbek or Soviet Tajik national identities.

World War II and the Holocaust brought a lot of Ashkenazi Jewish refugees from the European regions of the Soviet Union and Eastern Europe through Uzbekistan.

Starting in 1972, one of the largest Bukharan Jewish emigrations in history occurred as the Jews of Uzbekistan and Tajikistan immigrated to Israel and the United States, due to looser restrictions on immigration. In the late 1980s to the early 1990s, almost all of the remaining Bukharan Jews left Central Asia for the United States, Israel, Europe, or Australia in the last mass emigration of Bukharan Jews from their resident lands.

After 1991
With the disintegration of the Soviet Union and foundation of the independent Republic of Uzbekistan in 1991, some feared growth of nationalistic policies in the country. The resurgence of Islamic fundamentalism in Uzbekistan and Tajikistan prompted an increase in the level of emigration of Jews (both Bukharan and Ashkenazi). Before the collapse of the USSR, there were 45,000 Bukharan Jews in Central Asia.

Today, there are about 150,000 Bukharan Jews in Israel (mainly in the Tel Aviv metropolitan area including the neighborhoods of Tel Kabir, Shapira, Kiryat Shalom, HaTikvah and cities like Or Yehuda, Ramla, and Holon) and 60,000 in the United States (especially Queens—a borough of New York that is widely known as the "melting pot" of the United States due to its ethnic diversity)—with smaller communities in the USA like Phoenix, South Florida, Atlanta, San Diego, Los Angeles, Seattle, and Denver. Only a few thousand still remain in Uzbekistan. About 500 live in Canada (mainly Toronto, Ontario and Montreal, Quebec). Almost no Bukharan Jews remain in Tajikistan (compared to the 1989 Jewish population of 15,000 in Tajikistan).

Immigrant populations

Tajikistan
In early 2006, the still-active Dushanbe Synagogue in Tajikistan as well as the city's mikveh (ritual bath), kosher butcher, and Jewish schools were demolished by the government (without compensation to the community) to make room for the new Palace of Nations. After an international outcry, the government of Tajikistan announced a reversal of its decision and publicly claimed that it would permit the synagogue to be rebuilt on its current site. However, in mid-2008, the government of Tajikistan destroyed the whole synagogue and started construction of the Palace of Nations. The Dushanbe synagogue was Tajikistan's only synagogue and the community were therefore left without a centre or a place to pray. As a result, the majority of Bukharan Jews from Tajikistan living in Israel and the United States have very negative views towards the Tajik government and many have cut off all ties they had with the country. In 2009, the Tajik government reestablished the synagogue in a different location for the small Jewish community.

United States

Currently, Bukharan Jews are mostly concentrated in the U.S. in New York City. In Forest Hills, Queens, 108th Street, often referred to as "Bukharan Broadway" or "Bukharian Broadway", is filled with Bukharan restaurants and gift shops. Furthermore, Forest Hills is nicknamed  "Bukharlem" due to the majority of the population being Bukharian. They have formed a tight-knit enclave in this area that was once primarily inhabited by Ashkenazi Jews. Congregation Tifereth Israel in Corona, Queens, a synagogue founded in the early 1900s by Ashkenazi Jews, became Bukharan in the 1990s. Kew Gardens, Queens, also has a very large population of Bukharan Jews.  Author Janet Malcolm has taken an interest in Bukharan Jews in the U.S., writing at length about Jeffrey Moussaieff Masson and, in Iphigenia in Forest Hills: Anatomy of a Murder Trial, about the 2007 contract murder of Daniel Malakov organized by his ex-wife Mazoltuv Borukhova. Although Bukharan Jews in Queens remain insular in some ways (living in close proximity to each other, owning and patronizing clusters of stores, and attending their own synagogue rather than other synagogues in the area), they have connections with non-Bukharans in the area. 

In December 1999, the First Congress of the Bukharian Jews of the United States and Canada convened in Queens. In 2007, Bukharan-American Jews initiated lobbying efforts on behalf of their community. Zoya Maksumova, president of the Bukharan women's organization "Esther Hamalka" said "This event represents a huge leap forward for our community. Now, for the first time, Americans will know who we are." Senator Joseph Lieberman intoned, "God said to Abraham, 'You'll be an eternal people'… and now we see that the State of Israel lives, and this historic [Bukharan] community, which was cut off from the Jewish world for centuries in Central Asia and suffered oppression during the Soviet Union, is alive and well in America. God has kept his promise to the Jewish people."

Culture

Dress codes
Bukharan Jews had their own dress code, similar to but also different from other cultures (mainly Turco-Mongol) living in Central Asia. On weddings today, one can still observe the bride and the close relatives donning the traditional kaftan (Jomah-ҷома-ג'אמה in Bukhori and Tajik).

Music

The Bukharan Jews have a distinct musical tradition called shashmaqam, which is an ensemble of stringed instruments, infused with Central Asian rhythms, and a considerable klezmer influence as well as Muslim melodies, and even Spanish chords. The main instrument is the dayereh. Shashmaqam music "reflect[s] the mix of Hassidic vocals, Indian and Islamic instrumentals and Sufi-inspired texts and lyrical melodies." Ensemble Shashmaqam was one of the first New York-based ensembles created to showcase the music and dance of Bukharan Jews.  The Ensemble was created in 1983 by Shumiel Kuyenov, a dayereh player from Queens.

Cuisine

Bukharan cuisine consists of many unique dishes, distinctly influenced by ethnic dishes historically and currently found along the Silk Road and many parts of Central and even Southeast Asia. Shish kabob, or shashlik, as it is often referred to in Russian, are popular, made of chicken, beef or lamb. Pulled noodles, often thrown into a hearty stew of meat and vegetables known as lagman, are similar in style to Chinese lamian, also traditionally served in a meat broth.  Samsa, pastries filled with spiced meat or vegetables, are baked in a unique, hollowed out tandoor oven, and greatly resemble the preparation and shape of Indian samosas.

The Bukharians' Jewish identity was always preserved in the kitchen. "Even though we were in exile from Jerusalem, we observed kashruth," said Isak Masturov, another owner of Cheburechnaya. "We could not go to restaurants, so we had to learn to cook for our own community.

Plov is a very popular slow-cooked rice dish spiced with cumin and containing carrots, and in some varieties, chick peas or raisins, and often topped with beef or lamb. Another popular dish is baksh which consists of rice, beef and liver cut into small cubes, with cilantro, which adds a shade of green to the rice once it's been cooked.  Most Bukharan Jewish communities still produce their traditional breads including non (lepyoshka in Russian), a circular bread with a flat center that has multiple pattern of designs, topped with black and regular sesame seeds, and the other, called non toki, bears the dry and crusty features of traditional Jewish matzah, but with a distinctly wheatier taste.

After Sabbath synagogue service, Bukharan Jews often eat steamed eggs and sweet potatoes followed by a dish of fish such as carp.  Next comes the main meal called oshesvo.

Genetics 
A 2013 genetic study of multiple Jewish groups, including Bukharan Jews, found that Bukharan Jews clustered closely with Jewish communities from the Middle East and the Caucasus such as Iranian Jews, Mountain Jews, Georgian Jews, Kurdish Jews and Iraqi Jews, as well as other Middle Eastern and West Asian people including Kurds, Iranians, Armenians, Syrians, Druze and others; and did not cluster with their former neighbours.

Notable Bukharan Jews

Afghanistan
Zablon Simintov – only remaining Jew in Afghanistan

United Kingdom 

 Yvonne Green (née Mammon) – poet and translator
 Anthony Yadgaroff – British businessman, Jewish community leader

Israel

 Yisrael Aharoni –  Israeli chef and restaurateur
 Yoni Ben-Menachem – Israeli journalist; General Director of Israel Broadcasting Authority
 Amnon Cohen – Israeli politician and member of the Knesset for Shas
 Guy Haimov – professional football player 
 Shimon Hakham – Bukharan-Israeli rabbi, writer, one of the founders of the Bukharan Quarter
 Robert Ilatov – Israeli politician and member of the Knesset for Yisrael Beiteinu
 Avi Issacharoff – Israeli journalist and creator of the series Fauda
 Lev Leviev – billionaire businessman, investor, philanthropist, president of the World Congress of Bukharian Jews
 Nitzan Kaikov – Israeli songwriter and music producer
 Yosef Maimon – religious leader
 Rinat Matatov – Israeli actress
 Moshe Mishaelof – professional football  player 
 Shlomo Moussaieff – co-founder of the Bukharan Quarter in Jerusalem
 Shlomo Moussaieff – Israeli millionaire businessman
 Dorrit Moussaieff – former First Lady of Iceland
 Rafael Pinhasi – Israeli politician and member of the Knesset for Shas
 Esther Roth-Shahamorov – Israeli former track and field athlete
 Eson Kandov – Singer and Honored People's Artist of the USSR  
 Gideon Sa'ar – Israeli politician who served as a member of Knesset for New Hope
 Yulia Shamalov-Berkovich – Israeli politician who served as a member of the Knesset for Kadima from 2009-2013
 Idan Yaniv – Israeli singer, "2007 Israeli Artist of the Year"
 Benjamin Yusupov – Israeli classical composer, conductor and pianist

United States

 Jacob Arabov – proprietor of Jacob & Co.
 Michael Aronov – American actor and playwright, Tony Award winner
 Boris Kandov – President of the Bukharian Jewish Congress of the US and Canada
 Jeffrey Moussaieff Masson – author
 Jacob Nasirov – Bukharan-American rabbi from Afghanistan (member of the Bukharian Rabbinical Counsel)
 Rus Yusupov – Bukharan-American Internet entrepreneur; co-founder of Vine
 Iosef Yusupov – designer

Other

 Ari Babakhanov – musician from Uzbekistan
 Rena Galibova – Soviet actress, "People's Artist of Tajikistan" (an awarded title, alluding to national prominence)
 Meirkhaim Gavrielov – journalist murdered in Tajikistan in 1998
 Barno Itzhakova – vocalist, famous for her rendition of traditional Shashmaqom songs in Tajik and Uzbek
 Malika Kalontarova – dancer, "People's Artist of Soviet Union" (Queen of Eastern Dance)
 Fatima Kuinova – Soviet singer, "Merited Artist of the Soviet Union"
 Ilyas Malayev – musician and poet from Uzbekistan, "Honoured Artist of Uzbekistan"
 Shoista Mullodzhanova – Shashmakon singer, "People's Artist of Tajikistan" (Queen of Shashmakom music)
 Gavriel Mullokandov – popular Shashmakom artist, "People's Artist of Uzbekistan"
 Suleiman Yudakov – Soviet composer and musician, "People's Artist of the Uzbek SSR"

See also
 Bukharan Jews in Israel
 Bukhori dialect
 Africa Israel Investments
 Bais Yaakov Machon Academy
 Dushanbe Synagogue
 Emirate of Bukhara
 History of the Jews in Russia and the Soviet Union
 History of the Jews under Muslim Rule
 Ohr Avner Foundation

References
Notes

Bibliography
 Ricardo Garcia-Carcel: La Inquisición, Biblioteca El Sol. Biblioteca Básica de Historia. Grupo Anaya, Madrid, Spain 1990. .

External links
 
 Bukharian Isralites
 The Great Aminoff Escape Saga
 Joseph Mammon. My Story
 Official World Wide Bukharian Community Website
 BJews.com, Bukharian Jewish Global Portal
 Cooper, Alanna E. Bukharan Jews and the Dynamics of Global Judaism. Bloomington: Indiana University Press, 2012.
 "Alanna's Cooper's publications on Bukharan Jews", kikayon.com
 Elena Neva, "Heavenly Frogs in the Art of Bukharian Jewelers", Kunstpedia, March 19, 2009.
 "Bukharian Jews protect their culture in a N.Y. enclave", Haaretz (Reuters), October 21, 2009.
 
 
 
 
 Bukharian Torah Lectures by Bukharian Rabbis

 
Jewish ethnic groups
 
Ethnic groups in Uzbekistan